David Kilminster (born 25 January 1962) is a British guitarist, vocalist, songwriter, producer and music teacher, who has toured as a sideman to several prestigious musicians, including progressive rock artists Steven Wilson and Roger Waters.

Biography
Dave Kilminster began playing piano in childhood, and later took up the guitar. During his youth he also sang in a barbershop quartet.

In 1991 he won the 'Guitarist of the Year' award in a competition run by Guitarist Magazine with the instrumental song Sundance; at that time he had a temporary job working on computers for IBM. Shortly after, Kilminster was asked to teach at the Guitar Institute in Acton. His job there also involved writing exam material and courses for Trinity College and Thames Valley University.

Kilminster has taught at the Academy of Contemporary Music in Guildford and written for Guitar Techniques magazine. He has launched a series of instructional DVDs for Roadrock's Lick Library after the success of his global satellite series, named Killer Guitar.

In 2002, Kilminster toured with Keith Emerson and Emerson's group The Nice, emulating the guitar work of David O'List. An album has been published called Vivacitas Live at Glasgow 2002, starring Keith Emerson, Lee Jackson and Brian Davison of The Nice, as well as Dave Kilminster, Phil Williams and Pete Riley assisting.  From 2006 to 2008, he toured with Roger Waters on his The Dark Side of the Moon and from 2010 to 2013 he toured as lead guitarist on Waters' The Wall Live 2010–2013 tour. On both tours, he performed similar parts to David Gilmour on the original studio albums. He has also played alongside John Wetton (ex King Crimson), Ken Hensley (ex Uriah Heep), Qango (an Asia spin-off), The Nice, and Carl Palmer. In May 2015, Kilminster replaced Guthrie Govan in Steven Wilson's band for its 2015 North American tour. From 2017 to 2018 Kilminster joined Roger Waters on his North American "Us + Them" tour.  David is playing guitar on Roger Waters’ 2022 / 2023 This Is Not A Drill farewell tour.

Dave re-released his acoustic guitar album 'Playing with Fire' in 2004. In 2007, he launched the rock album Scarlet, which featured Emerson bandmates, drummer Pete Riley and bassist Phil Williams. The album was re-released as 'Scarlet – The Director's Cut' in 2012. This was followed up by a new album of original material, and ... The Truth will set you free in 2014. Kilminster co-produced Anne-Marie Helder's first solo album The Contact (2004). She sings backing vocals on Scarlet.

Style and equipment 

Kilminster is left-handed, but after damaging his right wrist in a go-kart accident, he started playing guitar right-handed. He has since said he is ambidextrous
He has used many different playing techniques such as tapping and sweep picking, but considers them to be "just tools really" and not an important part of his playing style.

Kilminster has used Fender Telecasters and Takamine acoustic guitars. For the Dark Side of the Moon tour, he used a Richie Kotzen signature telecaster with custom DiMarzio pickups. He has used Cornford guitar amplifiers. As of May 2015, he uses Suhr custom-made guitars and Brunetti amplifiers.

References

External links
 Dave Kilminster.com ─ official site
 Brunetti Tube Amplification

English rock guitarists
English male guitarists
English songwriters
English male singers
Living people
1962 births
Qango (band) members
British male songwriters